The Saffron Walden by-election of 23 March 1965 was held after the awarding of a life peerage to Conservative MP Rab Butler.

The seat was safe, having been won at the 1964 United Kingdom general election by 5,000 votes

Result of the previous general election

Result of the by-election

References

1965 in England
1965 elections in the United Kingdom
By-election, 1965
By-elections to the Parliament of the United Kingdom in Essex constituencies
1960s in Essex